Museum Kimchikan, formerly Kimchi Museum, is a museum dedicated to kimchi; one of the staples of Korean cuisine. Exhibits focus on the food's history, its many historical and regional varieties, and its importance to Korean culture and cuisine. The museum collects data and statistics on kimchi and regularly offers activities for visitors, such as demonstrations of the kimchi-making process, kimchi tastings, and cooking classes. The Kimchi Field Museum was Korea's first food museum. In 2015, it was selected by CNN as one of the world's best food museums.

General information
The Kimchi Field Museum was established in 1986, and is located in the Jongno District of Seoul, South Korea.

The museum was reopened at Insa-dong, Jongno District, Seoul, Korea on April 21, 2015.

History

The Kimchi Field Museum was originally established in 1986 in Pil-dong, Jung-gu. From 1987, the museum was managed by Pulmuone Inc., one of the largest food production companies in Korea. In 1988, the museum was moved to the COEX (Convention and Exhibition Center) in connection with the Summer Olympic Games held in Seoul, South Korea.

In 2000, the museum was renovated so as to expand and improve its facilities for visitors in anticipation of the third Asia–Europe Meeting in Seoul, designed to deepen political, economic, and cultural relationships between its 41 member countries.

Permanent exhibition

The first part of the museum has three sections covering the long history of kimchi, including a detailed timeline for visitors. 
 The Exhibition of Ancient Books on the History of Kimchi 
 Kimchi Trends throughout Korean History 
 How hot peppers became a kimchi ingredient

The second branch of the Kimchi Field Museum consists of displays on the process of kimchi making, as well as short documentaries which play at regular intervals. Here, visitors can view models of 80 different kinds of kimchi and compare recipes (with a picture and description for each). In addition, there is information about what kinds of spices people have used before they adopted red peppers from Japan and Korea. Another section illustrates the regional varieties of kimchi by geographic district.

The museum provides detailed explanations of the process of making kimchi, with a diorama for each step. There is also one section in which people can view the typical environment in which kimchi would be made, including the historic pottery forms used for the fermentation and storage processes.

There are two photo zones where people can take pictures of kimchi, a display on the nutritional benefits of kimchi, and compare it with other kinds of fermented vegetables around the world. Guests are also welcome to visit an area where they can observe the Lactobacillus bacteria in kimchi through a microscope. The museum also displays a large world map with countries to which Kimchi is exported. A tasting room is open for visitors to test two different kinds of kimchi each month.

The final section of the museum consists of a resource room, where people can read books about kimchi and other traditional foods of Korea. Visitors can access kimchi-related articles and movies in the resource room.

References

See also

Kimchi
Tteok & Kitchen Utensil Museum
List of museums in Seoul

World Trade Center Seoul
Museums in Seoul
Kimchi
Food and drink museums
Museums established in 1986
1986 establishments in South Korea